Claës Christian Olrog (25 November 1912 – 29 November 1985) was a Swedish-born ornithologist who worked in Argentina. He published Las Aves Argentinas (1959) which was one of the first field guides for Argentina.

Olrog was born in Stockholm and was educated at Uppsala and Stockholm. In 1939 he visited Tierra del Fuego as part of his PhD research. In 1946 he travelled into Paraguay and took up a teaching position at the Miguel Lillo Institute in 1948. He published a field guide to the birds of the region in 1959 - Las Aves Argentinas. A new edition was produced in 1984. He described several new tax and several species have also been named after him.

References 
 

1912 births
1985 deaths
Scientists from Stockholm
Argentine ornithologists
Swedish emigrants to Argentina